Cyphocleonus is a genus of true weevil.

Species 
 Cyphocleonus achates
 Cyphocleonus adumbratus
 Cyphocleonus armitagei
 Cyphocleonus cenchrus
 Cyphocleonus dealbatus
 Cyphocleonus hedenborgi
 Cyphocleonus sparsus
 Cyphocleonus sventeniusi
 Cyphocleonus trisulcatus

References 

Molytinae